Halichoeres scapularis, commonly called the Zigzag wrasse , is a fish species in the wrasse family native from the Indo-West Pacific.

Description
The zigzag wrasse is a small fish that can reach a maximum length of 20 cm.

It has a thin, elongate body with a terminal mouth. Its coloration pattern varies depending on the maturity stages.

As a juvenile and a female, the zigzag wrasse has a pearly white background coloration with a black or yellow or also black and yellow stripe zigzagging along the lateral line.

As a mature male, the body coloration is very elaborated. The inferior side of the lateral line is pearly with pinkish reflection. The black or yellow line tend to disappear with age or it can be reduced to a short dash. The superior part is greenish with pink accents until the base of the dorsal fin. The base of the dorsal fin is highlighted by a bright yellow line. Then superimposed over this later yellow line a blue line, a yellow one, green one and finally a fin pinkish one. The iris of the eye is orange.

Distribution & habitat
The zigzag wrasse is widespread throughout the tropical and subtropical waters of the Indo-West Pacific, from the eastern coast of Africa, Red Sea included, to the Philippines and from New Caledonia to south Japan.

The zigzag wrasse appreciates mixed areas of top reef (sand/rubble/corals) in shallow water down to 20 meters depth.

Biology
The zigzag wrasse can live in small group but is usually solitary and even aggressive towards members of its own species.

Like most wrasse, the chain-lined wrasse is a protogynous hermaphrodite, i.e. individuals start life as females with the capability of turning male later on.

Conservation status
The species is targeted but not thought to be threatened by the aquarium trade. It is listed as Least Concern (LC) on the UICN.

References

External links
 

scapularis
Taxa named by Edward Turner Bennett
Fish described in 1832